Grigory Yakovlevich Bey-Bienko (7 February 1903 – 3 November 1971) was a Soviet and Russian entomologist who specialized in Orthoptera.

Born in Bilopillia, he graduated from the Omsk Institute of Agriculture, worked in the USSR Institute for Plants Protection (Vsesoyuznij Institut Zaschity Rastenij, 1929–1938), Leningrad Agricultural Institute (1938–1968) and Institute for Zoology of the Academy of Sciences of the Soviet Union (starting in 1948). He was a Stalin Prize winner (1952), corresponding member of the Academy of Sciences of the Soviet Union (starting in 1953) and chairman of the USSR Entomology Society (starting in 1966)

He was one of the editors of Keys to the Insects of the European Part of the USSR (Leningrad, Nauka; published in English by Amerind Publishing, New Delhi) and Fauna of the European Part of the USSR (Leningrad, Nauka; published in English by Amerind Publishing, New Delhi).

References
Bey-Bienko, Grigory Yakovlevich article in the Great Soviet Encyclopedia

Selected works
Bey-Bienko G. Ya., 1954: Insecta: Orthoptera: Tettigoniidae: Phaneropterinae. Fauna SSSR. 388 pp.
Bey-Bienko G. Ya., 1962 Об общей классификации насекомых (On the general classification of insects). Энтомологическое обозрение (Entomol. Rev. URSS) 49 (1): 6–21

1903 births
1971 deaths
Corresponding Members of the USSR Academy of Sciences
Omsk State Agrarian University alumni
Stalin Prize winners
Recipients of the Order of the Red Banner of Labour
Soviet entomologists